Azmizi bin Azmi (born 28 May 1986) is a Malaysian footballer who plays for Perlis in Malaysia Premier League as a defender.

Club career
Azmizi started his career in Perlis youth team, before gaining his chance in the senior squad in 2007. He played in the 2007 Malaysia FA Cup final, which Perlis has lost against Kedah. He was their club captain until the 2011 league season.

Azmizi moved to Kedah on loan for their 2011 Malaysia Cup campaign, as Perlis do not qualify for the tournament as a result of finishing last in the 2011 Super League Malaysia.

In 2012, Azmizi permanently joined Kedah for 2012 Super League Malaysia season, along with his Perlis teammate Mohd Sany Mat Isa.

Career statistics

Club

References

External links
 

1986 births
Living people
Malaysian footballers
Perlis FA players
Kedah Darul Aman F.C. players
Perak F.C. players
People from Perlis
Malaysian people of Malay descent
PKNS F.C. players
Association football defenders